This is a list of people who have served as Lord Lieutenant of Sligo.

There were lieutenants of counties in Ireland until the reign of James II, when they were renamed governors. The office of Lord Lieutenant was recreated on 23 August 1831.

Governors

 William Blayney, 6th Baron Blayney c1690–  (died 1705)
 Joshua Cooper: 1746–1755
 Joshua Cooper: 1758–1800
 Edward King, 1st Earl of Kingston: 1772–1797
 Charles O'Hara, 1789–1822
 Owen Wynne, 1789–1831
 Henry King, 1795–1821 (died 1821)
 Joshua Edward Cooper, 1802–1831
 John Irwin, –1831

Lord Lieutenants
 Sir Francis Knox-Gore, 1st Baronet, 5 December 1831 – December 1868
 Sir Robert Gore-Booth, 4th Baronet, 18 December 1868  – 21 December 1876
 Edward Henry Cooper, 10 March 1877 – 26 February 1902
 Charles Kean O'Hara, 27 May 1902 – 1922

References

Sligo